McGee or McGees may refer to:

People
 McGee (surname), a surname of Irish origin, including a list of people with this surname

Places

United States
McGee, Missouri
McGees, Washington
McGee, West Virginia

Games
McGee (video game series), a series of computer games for young children

See also